Uda or UDA may refer to:

UDA 
 UD Almería, a Spanish football club
 Unión Deportivo Ascensión, a Peruvian football club
 Ulster Defence Association, a loyalist paramilitary organisation in Northern Ireland
 Union des artistes, a Quebec actors' union
 Union for Democratic Action, an American political organization
 United Democratic Alliance (disambiguation), various political parties
 Urban Development Authority, a department of the Ministry of Urban Development (Sri Lanka)
 University of Atacama
 UDA Holdings, a Malaysian holding company

Places 
Uda, Argeș, a commune in Argeș County, Romania
Uda, Nara, a city in Japan
Uda District, Nara, Japan
Uda District, Iwaki, a district of Iwaki Province, Japan during the Nara period
Wuda District, Wuhai, Inner Mongolia, China (sometimes called Uda District)
Uda, a village in Tătăruși Commune, Iași County, Romania

Rivers
Uda (Khabarovsk Krai), a river in the Russian Far East, flowing into the Sea of Okhotsk
Uda (Selenga), a tributary of the Selenga in Buryatia, Russia
Uda River (Uda), a river in Japan; see Shibuya River
Uda, the name for the upper course of the river Chuna in Irkutsk Oblast, Russia
Uda, another name for the river Udy, a tributary of the Donets in Ukraine

People 
 Emperor Uda (866–931), Emperor of Japan
 Uda (surname), a surname

Other uses 
 Uda language, a language of Nigeria
 Uda-class oiler, a class of oilers built for the Soviet Navy
 Uda sheep, a breed of sheep